Tidiane Dia (born 12 April 1985) is a Senegalese former professional footballer who played as a striker.

Career
Dia has played for Pau FC, on loan from Paris FC, and in Championnat de France amateur for GSI Pontivy.

References

1985 births
Living people
Association football forwards
Senegalese footballers
Valenciennes FC players
Ligue 2 players
Paris FC players
Footballers from Dakar
Pau FC players
GSI Pontivy players
US Rail players
Club Africain players
Senegalese expatriate footballers
Senegalese expatriate sportspeople in Tunisia
Expatriate footballers in Tunisia
Senegalese expatriate sportspeople in France
Expatriate footballers in France